Ionatana Ionatana, CVO OBE CPM (5 November 1938 – 8 December 2000), was a political figure from the Pacific nation of Tuvalu. He represented the constituency of Funafuti in the Parliament of Tuvalu. He was the fifth Prime Minister of Tuvalu from 27 April 1999 until his death on 8 December 2000.

Background
He joined the police and rose to become the chief of police in 1976. In 1977 he was appointed the government secretary and adviser to the cabinet. On 26 April 1979, he was appointed as the ambassador to the United States (non-resident).

Ionatana was elected to Parliament in the 1981 Tuvalu general election. Ionatana was noted for his republican leanings.

He held three portfolios in the second government of Bikenibeu Paeniu (1996 to 1998):  the Minister for Health, Women and Community Affairs; Minister for Education and Culture; and the Minister for Tourism, Trade and Commerce; and after the 1998 election he retained the first 2 portfolios in the 3rd government of Paeniu.

Prime Minister of Tuvalu
In 1999 Ionatana succeeded Bikenibeu Paeniu as Prime Minister of Tuvalu. Ionatana was elected as prime minister on 27 April 1999. Among the prominent issues of his period of office, he oversaw Tuvalu's entry into the United Nations on 5 September 2000.  Also during his term, Tuvalu obtained the lucrative .tv internet country suffix.

Death
On 8 December 2000, shortly after the UN entry was completed, Ionatana suddenly collapsed and died. He had been giving a speech at the Vaiaku Lagi Hotel on Funafuti, and was 62 years old.  He was the first prime minister to die in office since Tuvalu became independent.  After his death Lagitupu Tuilimu took over as acting prime minister until 24 February 2001.

See also
 Foreign relations of Tuvalu

References

External links
Tuvalu's Prime Minister Ionatana dies after giving speech

Commanders of the Royal Victorian Order
Officers of the Order of the British Empire
Prime Ministers of Tuvalu
1938 births
2000 deaths
Ambassadors of Tuvalu to the United States
Communication ministers of Tuvalu
Culture ministers of Tuvalu
Education ministers of Tuvalu
Health ministers of Tuvalu
Public works ministers of Tuvalu
Trade ministers of Tuvalu
Tourism ministers of Tuvalu
Women's ministers of Tuvalu
Tuvaluan republicans